Fuimaono Faleomavaega Titimaea "Dicky" Tafua (born 4 October 1947) is a Samoan former rugby union prop and the former coach of Manu Samoa and the Samoa Sevens rugby team. In November 2021 he was elected to the Legislative Assembly of Samoa. He is the son of former MP Tafua Kalolo and the brother of former MP Tafua Maluelue Tafua.

He took up the position of coach in 2006. He is a former international for Samoa and captained the first Samoa team that played against Wales in 1989. He led Samoa to win their first Wellington sevens and Hong Kong sevens tournament in the 2006/07 season. In February 2009 it was announced that Tafua would coach Manu Samoa, replacing Niko Palamo. His term in the role expired in November 2011.

In June 2014 Tafua was appointed interim coach of the Samoa Sevens. The appointment was made permanent in August 2014. In June 2015 his contract was not renewed.

In September 2017 he was appointed Manu Samoa coach for a second time for a two-year term. In September 2018 his contract was terminated early and the position was readvertised. A subsequent claim for unfair dismissal was dismissed by the court.

Political career

In October 2021 Tafua announced he would be contesting the 2021 Aleipata-Itupa-i-Lalo by-election as a candidate for the FAST Party. He won by over 200 votes.

References

External links

Living people
Place of birth missing (living people)
Samoa national rugby sevens team coaches
1947 births
Samoa international rugby union players
Members of the Legislative Assembly of Samoa
Faʻatuatua i le Atua Samoa ua Tasi politicians
Samoan rugby union players
Samoan rugby union coaches
Rugby union props
Samoa national rugby union team coaches
Sportsperson-politicians